The Biskitts is an American animated television series produced by Hanna-Barbera Productions from 1983 to 1984 and aired on CBS. The series lasted for only one season; only 13 episodes were produced. Shirt Tales replaced the show in its time slot the following year. The Biskitts returned to that same time slot in March 1985 but only aired reruns in the remainder of that season. Following the series' retirement from CBS, like many other cartoons, it was acquired by the Armed Forces Network and shown throughout much of the 1980s, mainly as entertainment for children of deployed American servicemen in Asia and Europe.

In Jellystone!, the characters are mascots for the company Biskitt Farms. The Biskitts are occasionally seen in crowd shots. This indicates the characters actually exist in the series' universe.

Plot
The Biskitts are a group of tiny anthropomorphic dogs who live on Biskitt Island and are committed to guarding the crown jewels of Biskitt Castle. Modeled after Robin Hood, the Biskitts still serve their recently deceased king while performing good deeds for the underprivileged inhabitants of their tiny island. It is explained in the opening narration that due to their good reputation for responsibility and security, other kings have entrusted their treasures to be safeguarded by the Biskitts.

The villain of the series is the king's mean-spirited, wasteful, younger brother King Max who rules the neighboring Lower Suburbia. In lieu of a proper coronation, Max constantly schemes to steal the royal treasure with the help of his hench-hounds Fang and Snarl and his jester Shecky. The Biskitts are also in danger of being captured and eaten by a large wildcat named Scratch.

Characters

Biskitts
 Waggs (voiced by Darryl Hickman) – The protagonist of the series who leads the Biskitts on every mission and is always there if his friends are in trouble. He is Sweets' boyfriend.
 Sweets (voiced by Kathleen Helppie) – A kind and gentle Biskitt that is friendly to other animals as well as the Biskitts and very helpful. She is Waggs's girlfriend.
 Shiner (voiced by Jerry Houser) – Very lazy and selfish and jealous of Waggs' leadership. Sometimes when the Biskitts fall into a trap, Shiner blames Waggs for nothing. He makes Downer do all his work. However, he does have a hidden kindly side.
 Lady (voiced by B.J. Ward) – The posh Biskitt who likes to stay clean and pretty. Lady also likes decorating the castle.
 Bump (voiced by Bob Holt) – A strong Biskitt who is a bit dim and clumsy but is also helpful and friendly with Scat. In one episode, Bump found Shecky's jokes funny and became friends with him.
 Downer (voiced by Henry Gibson) – Downer is an unhappy and cowardly Biskitt, pessimistic that something bad will happen. He is the unlikely friend of Shiner, who makes him do work for him while Shiner lies about.
 Wiggle (voiced by Jennifer Darling) – Wiggle is another girl Biskitt who helps out with events. She likes Shiner but in one episode she had a crush on Waggs.
 Spinner (voiced by Bob Holt) – Spinner is the oldest and a wiser Biskitt. He helps the Biskitts when they stumble into something he knows about; in fact Spinner knows a lot about the swamp.
 Scat (voiced by Dick Beals) – Scat is a young Biskitt. He is industrious and brave, but sometimes his bravery can land him into trouble. Scat is friends with Bump who saves him sometimes from trouble.
 Mooch (voiced by Marshall Efron) – Mooch is the fat and gluttonous Biskitt who always thinks about food.

Minor Biskitts
 Rover (voiced by Peter Cullen) – Rover is a pirate-like Biskitt who has been away from Biskitt island for a long time.
 Flip – A laid-back Biskitt.
 Fetch (voiced by Kenneth Mars) – A silly-looking Biskitt.
 Princess Biskitt – The Princess Biskitt gets kidnapped by King Max to capture the Biskitts. The male Biskitts fall into the trap and was about to boiled alive with her. Sweets, Wiggle and Lady thought she was not real at first but found out that she is and saved the male Biskitts and Princess Biskitt from their hot watery doom.

Villains
 King Max (voiced by Kenneth Mars) – The evil, mean-spirited, and wasteful King who rules the neighboring Lower Suburbia and serves as the antagonist. He is the younger brother of the previous King. Why Max is not crowned as the new ruler of the Biskitts is never explained. He tries hard to go to Biskitts Castle to steal the royal treasure. King Max bosses Shecky around the castle most of the time and threatens the Biskitts to talk sometimes by trying to kill them, using methods that range from an eagle who does not like Biskitts attacking them to boiling them alive. Despite being the King, Max wears tatty, ripped clothes with the toe part of his left shoe missing.
 Shecky (voiced by Kip King) – Shecky is King Max's sidekick and court jester. However, Shecky is rather dimwitted and not always loyal to Max; he even made friends with Bump who shared his love of practical jokes. He is not just a jester, he also cleans, cooks, and does other jobs for King Max.
 Fang and Snarl (vocal effects provided by Kenneth Mars and Peter Cullen) – Fang and Snarl are King Max's hounds. They help Max and Shecky in sniffing the Biskitts out.
 Moat Monster (vocal effects provided by Frank Welker) – A serpentine monster that lives in the moat surrounding King Max's castle.
 Scratch (voiced by Peter Cullen) – Scratch is a wildcat who is always trying to catch the Biskitts and eat them. He lives in a cave somewhere in the swamp. When the Biskitts are near Scratch's cave, they need to be on the lookout for him. He has a cousin named Itch who caused the Biskitts confusion.

Other characters
 The Whiskers – A group of cats who only appear in the episode "Raiders of The Lost Bark".
 Mouser – Leader of the Whiskers. He befriends Sweets and shows her his home, Whisker Tree.
 Pendora – A female cat who has a crystal ball to see what's going on (Sweets notes that this is similar to the extensive knowledge in Spinner's book).
 Boots – A fat lazy cat who always sleeps so he could go to bed at night.
 Scaredy Cat – A cat who is afraid of everything.
 Mink – A pretty French-accented cat who has a crush on Scat after he saved her from Scratch.  She seems to be a feline version of Lady.
 Jinks – A cat with constant bad luck.
 Tiger – A tough cat with an eye patch, he seems to be the Whiskers' equivalent of Bump.
 Talon the Rat – A large rat who tries to eat the Whiskers, just like how Scratch hunts the Biskitts. When they crossed each other's paths, Talon was scared of Scratch and ran away, causing Scratch to chase him, thus ensuring that both of them weren't seen for a while.
 Itch (voiced by Frank Welker) - The cousin of Scratch who caused the Biskitts confusion. He only appeared in "Belling the Wild Cat."
 King Otto – A king who arrived with his army of knights to steal King Max's treasure. He only appeared in "King Max's War".
 The Witch – She tries to kidnap Sweets and Waggs and feed them to her mirror. But Spinner knows a lot about her and stops just in time, resulting in her castle getting destroyed along with her. She has a pet bat and a pet rat.
 Pyronce – The Dragon who menaced the Biskitts until he was defeated.

List of episodes

Music
Franz Liszt's Hungarian Rhapsody No. 2 is used in theme and in parts in some of episodes. William Hanna and Joseph Barbera used the tune in their 1946 Academy Award winning Tom and Jerry cartoon The Cat Concerto.

Cast

 Dick Beals - Scat
 Peter Cullen - Dog Foot, Snarl, Scratch, Rover
 Jennifer Darling - Wiggle
 Marshall Efron - Mooch
 Henry Gibson - Downer
 Kathleen Helppie - Sweets
 Darryl Hickman - Waggs
 Bob Holt - Bump, Flip, Spinner
 Jerry Houser - Shiner
 Kip King - Shecky
 Kenneth Mars - Fetch, King Max, Fang
 Mark L. Taylor -
 B.J. Ward - Lady
 Frank Welker - Itch, Moat Monster (uncredited)

Children's book
A children's book was created based on The Biskitts. In the book, it is discovered that King Max's jester Shecky bears a striking resemblance to King John, one of the kings who has entrusted his treasure to be safeguarded by the Biskitts. When King Max learns of this, he plots to use it to his advantage telling Shecky that they will attempt to steal King John's treasure by having Shecky impersonate King John to come and withdraw his treasure, and Max will pretend to be his slave. While Max and Shecky fool the Biskitts at first into thinking the real King John has come; Shecky seems to enjoy goofing off more and allowing Max to have to do all sorts of chores, much as King Max made him do plenty of demeaning labor.

White Castle promotion
White Castle Castle Meals featured different Biskitts-related games that could be assembled out of their boxes, such as being tossed into King Max's mouth.

Home media
An episode of the show, as part of the DVD collection, Saturday Mornings Cartoons: 1980s, was released on May 4, 2010.

On February 20, 2018, Warner Archive released The Biskitts – The Complete Series on DVD in region 1 as part of their Hanna-Barbera Classics Collection.

References

External links
 

1983 American television series debuts
1984 American television series endings
1980s American animated television series
American children's animated adventure television series
American children's animated comedy television series
American children's animated fantasy television series
CBS original programming
English-language television shows
Television series by Hanna-Barbera
Animated television series about dogs
Television series set on fictional islands
Television series about royalty